James Adkins may refer to:

 James Adkins (baseball) (born 1985), American baseball pitcher
 James A. Adkins (born 1954), adjutant general of Maryland
 James C. Adkins (1915–1994), justice for the Florida Supreme Court
 James Edward Adkins (1867–1939), Irish organist and composer